Attheya septentrionalis is a species of diatoms in the genus Attheya.

Description
In light microscope A. septentrionalis is distinguished from other Attheya by having curly setae. This species is easily confused with Attheya longicornis but the latter have long setae which are not curly.

References

External links
INA card for A. Septentrionalis

Protists described in 1994
Ochrophyte species
Coscinodiscophyceae